The third season of Packed to the Rafters, an Australian drama television series, began airing on 29 June 2010 on the Seven Network. The season concluded on 16 November 2010 after 22 episodes. The third season aired Tuesdays at 8:30 pm in Australia and averaged 1,894,000 viewers. The season was released on DVD as a six disc set under the title of Packed to the Rafters: The Complete Season 3 on 20 April 2011.

The third season follows the Rafters as they adjust to life with a new baby and face their toughest test yet, the sudden and tragic loss of a loved one. For Julie and Dave, there's the financial stress of being a one-income family, the sense of being pulled in a hundred directions by the needs of their adult children, and the strain placed on their marriage as the stress and exhaustion of caring for a baby takes hold. Rachel, the eldest Rafter child, struggles to find balance between her high-flying new job and her relationship with Jake; Ben, recently and blissfully married to Melissa, is trying for kids until a heartbreaking accident shatters his world; and Nathan is agonisingly estranged and ultimately divorced from his wife Sammy. Add to the mix, new family members Coby and Dave's father, Tom, and life for the Rafters has never been more packed.

Cast

Regular
 Rebecca Gibney as Julie Rafter
 Erik Thomson as Dave Rafter
 Jessica Marais as Rachel Rafter
 Angus McLaren as Nathan Rafter
 Hugh Sheridan as Ben Rafter
 George Houvardas as Carbo Karandonis
 Michael Caton as Ted Taylor
 Jessica McNamee as Sammy Rafter (episodes 1–8)
 Zoe Ventoura as Melissa Bannon (episodes 1–21)
 James Stewart as Jake Barton (episodes 11–22)

Featuring
 John Howard as Tom Jennings

Recurring and guest
 Gillian Jones as Rachel "Chel" Warne
Hannah and Sebella Storey as Ruby Rafter
Mercia Deane-Johns as Grace Barton
 Kristian Schmid as Alex Barton
 Sarah Chadwick as Trish Westaway
 Amy Mathews as Erin
 Hannah Marshall as Loretta 'Retta' Schembri
 Ryan Corr as Coby Jennings
 Grant Dodwell as Doug

Notes

Jessica McNamee's departure
Jessica McNamee confirmed on 30 July 2010 that she would be departing from the series, with plans to return to university to finish a deferred arts degree. McNamee's last episode aired in August 2010.

Zoe Ventoura's departure
It was revealed that the series was set to kill off one of its main characters and that it would not be revealed until the episode had aired. Towards the end of the episode, it was revealed that Melissa Bannon Rafter was involved in a car crash that took her life. The cause of the fatal crash was due to Mel using her mobile phone and driving at the same time. She went through a stop sign and was hit by another car. Ventoura stated that her characters departure was her decision because she wanted to pursue an acting career in the US. Her last episode aired in November 2010

On 20 February 2011, Ventoura put her plans to head to the states on hold, to star in another Seven Network series, Wild Boys.

Episodes

{| class="wikitable plainrowheaders" style="width:100%;"
|-style="color:white"
! style="background: #A41F1A;" | No. inseries
! style="background: #A41F1A;" | No. inseason
! style="background: #A41F1A;" | Title
! style="background: #A41F1A;" | Narrator
! style="background: #A41F1A;" | Directed by
! style="background: #A41F1A;" | Written by
! style="background: #A41F1A;" | Original Air Date
! style="background: #A41F1A;" | Australian Viewers(millions)
|-

|}

References

2010 Australian television seasons